The 1993 Army Cadets football team was an American football team that represented the United States Military Academy in the 1993 NCAA Division I-A football season. In their third season under head coach Bob Sutton, the Cadets compiled a 6–5 record and outscored their opponents by a combined total of 289 to 243.  In the annual Army–Navy Game, the Cadets defeated Navy, 16–14.

Schedule

Personnel

Game summaries

vs Navy

Navy kicker Ryan Bucchianeri missed an 18-yard field goal wide right in the closing seconds to preserve the Army win.

References

Army
Army Black Knights football seasons
Army Cadets football